Moonbin & Sanha is the first official sub-unit of South Korean boy band Astro. Formed by Fantagio in 2020, the group is composed of two Astro members: Moon Bin & Yoon San-ha. Their debut extended play, In-Out was released on September 14, 2020.

Career

Pre-debut 
On August 21, 2020, Fantagio Music released an image teaser with a logo and a date confirming that Moonbin and Sanha would form a sub-unit and release an EP in the next month. Before debut, both Moonbin and Sanha have co-hosted the music show Show Champion since March 2020 along with Verivery's Kangmin. In a press Q&A, Moonbin and Sanha stated that their chemistry while co-hosting inspired them to form a sub-unit.

2020–present: Debut with In-Out and Refuge
On September 14, 2020, Moonbin & Sanha officially debuted with the EP In-Out and its title track, "Bad Idea". A week later, on September 22, they gained their first music show trophy with the single on SBS MTV The Show. A week after its release, In-Out debuted at number 9 on the weekly overseas album chart of Oricon and at number 2 on the weekly album chart of Gaon.

On February 11, 2022, Moonbin & Sanha released the pre-release single "Ghost Town", before the release of their second EP Refuge on March 15, featuring the title track "Who".

On December 3, 2022, Fantagio announced that Moonbin & Sanha will make a comeback on January 4, 2023, and are scheduled to return with their third EP Incense.

Discography

Extended plays

Singles

Other charted songs

Contour fans 
 DIFFUSION (2023)

Notes

References 

South Korean boy bands
K-pop music groups
Fantagio artists
Musical groups from Seoul
Musical groups established in 2020
2020 establishments in South Korea